CAN may refer to:

Organizations 
 Andean Community of Nations, a South American trade bloc with Bolivia, Colombia, Ecuador and Peru
 Campus Antiwar Network, an American network of students opposing the occupation of Iraq
 Caja Navarra, a former savings banks in Navarre, Spain
 Chechnya Advocacy Network, an American non-government organization for Chechnya advocacy
 Christian Association of Nigeria, an umbrella organization containing numerous Christian denominations in Nigeria
 Climate Action Network, an international non-governmental network to limit human-induced climate change
 Corporate Angel Network, an American non-profit organization that arranges free air travel for cancer patients
 Cricket Association of Nepal, governing body of Nepali cricket
 Cult Awareness Network, an American organization operated by the Church of Scientology
 Cure Autism Now, a former American organization for autism advocacy
 Cycling Action Network, a New Zealand cycling advocacy group

Science and medicine 
 CAN (gene), a human gene
 Calcium ammonium nitrate, a fertilizer
 Ceric ammonium nitrate, an inorganic compound
 Chronic allograft nephropathy, the leading cause of kidney transplant failure

Computing 
 Campus area network or corporate area network, a computer network in a limited geographical area
 Cancel character, a precision control character in the C0 control code set
 CAN bus, controller area network bus, a type of microcontroller bus designed for vehicles
 Computer-assisted notetaking, or electronic notetaking
 Content addressable network, a distributed hash table for P2P
 Copper access node, a network device to provide xDSL signals on telephone lines, a.k.a. DSLAM

Other uses 
 Canada (ISO country code, IOC code), a country in North America
 Coupe d'Afrique des Nations (CAN) or Africa Cup of Nations, an association football competition in Africa
 Guangzhou Baiyun International Airport (IATA airport code), the main airport in Guangzhou, Guangdong, China
 Can (band),  a German experimental rock band

See also 
 Can (disambiguation)
 CANS (disambiguation)